Francisco Abel Segovia Vega (born 2 September 1979 in Seville, Andalusia) is a Spanish football manager and former player who played as a midfielder.

Managerial statistics

References

External links

Abel Segovia at Footballdatabase

1979 births
Living people
Footballers from Seville
Spanish footballers
Association football midfielders
Segunda División players
Segunda División B players
Sevilla Atlético players
Real Madrid Castilla footballers
Sporting de Gijón B players
Sporting de Gijón players
CD Leganés players
Deportivo Alavés B players
CD Castellón footballers
Mérida UD footballers
Cultural Leonesa footballers
CP Cacereño players
Écija Balompié players
Spanish football managers
Categoría Primera A managers
Patriotas Boyacá managers
Spanish expatriate football managers
Spanish expatriates in Colombia
Expatriate football managers in Colombia